The 2011–12 Division 1 Féminine season was the 38th since its establishment. Lyon are the defending champions. The league schedule was announced on 31 March 2011 and the fixtures were determined on 10 June. The season began on 3 September 2011 and ended on 2 June 2012. The winter break was in effect from 11 December 2011 to 7 January 2012.

Teams

There will be three promoted teams from the Division 2 Féminine, the second level of women's football in France, replacing the three teams that were relegated from the Division 1 Féminine following the 2010–11 season. A total of 12 teams will compete in the league with three clubs suffering relegation to the second division, Division 1 Féminine.

La Roche-sur-Yon was the first club to suffer relegation from the first division to the Division 2 Féminine. The club's impending drop occurred on 17 May 2011 following the team's 6–1 defeat to Paris Saint-Germain. The negative result made it mathematically impossible for La Roche-sur-Yon to seize the ninth position in the table, which would have allowed the club to remain in the first division. On the final day of the league season, both Le Mans and Toulouse were relegated to the second division. Toulouse were relegated after losing 5–1 to the champions Lyon. Le Mans drew 0–0 with Saint Étienne, but were unable to pass Yzeure, whom it was equal on points with, in the standings due to goal difference.

Vendenheim was the first club from the Division 2 Féminine to earn a place in the first division after winning Group A of the league. Vendenheim won its group by a 20-point margin. Soyaux was the second club to earn its place in the first division after defeating ES Blanquefort 4–0 win two matches to spare in its group. Vendenheim will be making its return to the first division after two seasons in the second division, while Soyaux will be back in the first division after only one season in the league. AS Muret earned promotion to the first division with only one match to spare after Aulnat Sportif 3–0 at home. On 15 June 2011, the French Football Federation ruled against Muret's promotion due to the club's non-utilization of a youth academy. Second-place club FCF Monteux was subsequently inserted in Muret's place. A day after the announcement, Muret released a press release on its official website announcing its intent to appeal the ruling at the CNOSF, the National Sporting Committee of France which governs sport in France. On 18 July, the CNOSF ruled in favor of Muret allowing the club to retain its promotion to the Division 1 Féminine.

Guingamp and Stade Briochin merger

On 18 August 2011, the presidential hierarchy of men's professional club En Avant de Guingamp and women's club Stade Briochin announced that the clubs had reached an agreement on a merger, which will come into effect at the start of the 2011–12 season. Under the agreement, Stade Briochin will dissolve and play as the women's team of Guingamp. All other remnants of the club remain the same, such as its president, manager, and players.

Teams promoted to Division 1 Féminine
 Vendenheim
 Soyaux
 Muret

Teams relegated to Division 2 Féminine
 Le Mans
 Toulouse
 La Roche-sur-Yon

Stadia and locations

Personnel and kits
1 Subject to change prior to start of the season.

League table

Note: A win in D1 Féminine is worth 4 points, with 2 points for a draw and 1 for a defeat.

Results

Statistics

Top goalscorers

Last updated: 3 June 2012
Source: Official Goalscorers' Standings

Top assists

Last updated: 3 June 2012
Source: Official Assists' Table

Hat-tricks

 4 Player scored 4 goals

Scoring
First goal of the season: Lotta Schelin for Lyon against Vendenheim (3 September 2011)
First own goal of the season: Noémie Freckhaus (Vendenheim) for Soyaux (25 September 2011)
Widest winning margin: 11 goals
Lyon 11–0 Muret (16 October 2011)
Highest scoring game: 11 goals
Lyon 11–0 Muret (16 October 2011)
Most goals scored in a match by a single team: 11 goals 
Lyon 11–0 Muret (16 October 2011)

Discipline
Worst overall disciplinary record (1 pt per yellow card, 3 pts per red card): 28 points
 Vendenheim (22 yellow & 2 red cards)
Best overall disciplinary record: 6 points
 Lyon (6 yellow & 0 red cards)
Most yellow cards (club): 25
 Yzeure
Most yellow cards (player): 5
 Faustine Roux (Yzeure)
Most red cards (club): 2
Muret
Vendenheim
Most red cards (player): 1
 Nora Hamou Maamar (Montpellier)
 Kadidia Diawara (Vendenheim)
 Caroline La Villa (Saint-Étienne)
 Julia Dany (Muret)
 Marine Fromantin (Muret)
 Noémie Sturm (Vendenheim)

Notable transfers

Paris Saint-Germain opened the transfer campaign by signing Rodez star Kenza Dali. The club later raided Rodez again, this time for French women's international Delphine Blanc, while also signing youth international Solène Barbance from Toulouse. Rodez later acquired Paris Saint-Germian striker Zohra Ayachi. In September 2011, in an effort to replace Ayachi, Paris Saint-Germain recruited American striker Allie Long. The defending champions Lyon made three signings. After losing Ingvild Stensland and backup goalkeeper Véronique Pons, manager Patrice Lair replaced the two with 18-year-old French youth international midfielder Makan Traoré and French senior international goalkeeper Céline Deville. In September 2011, Lyon signed Brazilian international Rosana. After winning the final edition of the Challenge de France last season, in an effort to establish themselves as league contenders, Saint-Étienne signed eight new players while also keeping the club's core players intact. Notables signing for the club include youth internationals Rose Lavaud and Charlotte Lorgeré, both of whom were signed from Toulouse who were relegated to the second division last season.

Other notable signings during the transfer window include Montpellier signing Japanese international and 2011 FIFA Women's World Cup champion Aya Sameshima, Yzeure signing former La Roche-sur-Yon captain Claire Guillard, Juvisy acquiring both goalkeeper Morgan Mancion and defender Julie Debever from Hénin-Beaumont, Rodez signing senior international goalkeeper Karima Benameur, and newly promoted Soyaux raiding third division club Arlac Mérignac for three players; 17-year-old striker Eva Sumo, starting goalkeeper Audrey Souletis, and Fidélia Poussil. Poussil had led Arlac Mérignac in goals during the 2010–11 Division 2 Féminine season as the club ultimately were relegated.

References

External links
 Official site
 Standings and Statistics

Fra
2011–12 in French football
2011
1